The Marquis of Qin (died 848 BC) was the second ruler of the ancient Chinese state of Qin, founded when his father Feizi was granted a small fief at Qin by King Xiao of Zhou.  The Marquis of Qin succeeded his father, who died in 858 BC, and ruled for 10 years.  He died in 848 BC and was succeeded by his son Gongbo.  His ancestral name was Ying, but his given name is not known.

Although Qin would eventually develop into a major power that would conquer all other Chinese states and unite China in 221 BC to start the Qin Dynasty, at the time of the Marquis of Qin it was still a minor state of the Western Zhou Dynasty classified as an "attached state" (附庸, fuyong).  Qin rulers did not receive any nobility rank until four generations later during the reign of Duke Xiang of Qin, so "the Marquis of Qin" was presumably an honorific posthumous title that his descendants used to refer to him.

References

Rulers of Qin
9th-century BC Chinese monarchs
848 BC deaths
Year of birth unknown
Unidentified people